Galvarino (died c. November 30, 1557) was a famous Mapuche warrior during the majority of the early part of the Arauco War. He fought and was taken prisoner along with one hundred and fifty other Mapuche, in the Battle of Lagunillas against governor García Hurtado de Mendoza. As punishment for insurrection, some of these prisoners were condemned to amputation of their right hand and nose, while others such as Galvarino had both hands cut off. Galvarino and the rest were then released as a lesson and warning for the rest of the Mapuche. Mendoza sent him to inform general Caupolicán of the number and quality of the people which had entered their land again, to put some fear into him, among other means that were tried, so that he might submit without coming to blows.

When returning to the Mapuche he appeared before Caupolicán and the council of war, showing them his mutilations, crying out for justice and a greater rising of the Mapuche against this Spanish invader like the one of Lautaro. For his bravery and gallantry he was named by the council to command a squadron. With knives fastened on both mutilated wrists replacing his hands he fought next to Caupolicán in the following campaign until the Battle of Millarapue where his squadron fought against that of governor Mendoza himself where he was able to strike down the number two in command.

However Mendoza's command broke Galvarino's division after over an hour of combat and won the battle killing three thousand Mapuche, and captured more than eight hundred including him.  Mendoza ordered him to be executed by being thrown to the dogs.

In the book La Araucana, written by Alonso de Ercilla, he explains that the real death of Galvarino was by hanging.

References

Sources 
 Jerónimo de Vivar,  Crónica y relación copiosa y verdadera de los reinos de Chile (Chronicle and abundant and true relation of the kingdoms of Chile) ARTEHISTORIA REVISTA DIGITAL; Crónicas de América (on line in Spanish) Capítulo CXXXII, CXXXIII 
 Pedro Mariño de Lobera,  Crónica del Reino de Chile, escrita por el capitán Pedro Mariño de Lobera....reducido a nuevo método y estilo por el Padre Bartolomé de Escobar.  Edición digital a partir de Crónicas del Reino de Chile Madrid, Atlas, 1960, pp. 227-562, (Biblioteca de Autores Españoles; 569-575).  Biblioteca Virtual Miguel de Cervantes (on line in Spanish) Libro 2, Capítulo II, III, IV

16th-century Mapuche people
People of the Arauco War
Indigenous military personnel of the Americas
1557 deaths
Characters in La Araucana
Executed military personnel
People without hands
People killed in the Arauco War
Warriors of Central and South America